Aleksandar Dimitrov (born 12 September 1976) is a Bulgarian football manager and former footballer.

Managerial career
Dimitrov served as manager of Beroe Stara Zagora; he resigned on 17 October 2016.  On 14 March 2017, he was appointed as manager of Lokomotiv Gorna Oryahovitsa.

On 20 December 2018, Dimitrov was named the coach of Bulgaria's U21 side. Under his management the team went close to qualifying for the 2021 UEFA European Under-21 Championship, but eventually missed out. In December 2020, it was revealed by the Bulgarian Football Union that Dimitrov's contract will not be extended.

References

External links

1976 births
Living people
Bulgarian footballers
PFC Belasitsa Petrich players
Akademik Sofia players
First Professional Football League (Bulgaria) players
Expatriate footballers in Indonesia
Bulgarian football managers
PFC Beroe Stara Zagora managers
Association football midfielders